John Clement Seale  ACS ASC (born 5 October 1942) is an Australian cinematographer. He won an Oscar for his work in the 1996 film The English Patient, in addition to a BAFTA and Satellite Award. He is a member of both the Australian Cinematographers Society (ACS) and the American Society of Cinematographers (ASC).

Life and career 
Seale was born in Warwick, Queensland, Australia, to Marjorie Lyndon (née Pool) and Eric Clement Seale. He received Oscar nominations for his work on Witness, Rain Man, and Cold Mountain, and won for The English Patient. Seale directed one film, Till There Was You, in 1990. He is a four-time Oscar nominee, five-time BAFTA nominee, and four-time ASC Award nominee.

His greatest commercial successes have been Harry Potter and the Philosopher's Stone, which grossed US$974 million; Rain Man, which grossed US$354 million; Prince of Persia: The Sands of Time, which grossed US$335 million; The Perfect Storm, which grossed US$328 million; and The Tourist, which grossed US$278 million.

He came out of retirement in 2012 to shoot Mad Max: Fury Road, for which he received another Academy Award nomination.

Seale was appointed a Member of the Order of Australia in the 2002 Australia Day Honours in recognition of his "service to the arts as an Australian and internationally acclaimed cinematographer".

Filmography

Awards and nominations

Academy Awards

British Academy of Film & Television (BAFTA) Awards

American Society of Cinematographers (ASC) Awards

Australian Academy of Cinema and Television Arts (AACTA) Awards

Other awards 

Satellite Awards

European Film Awards

Brisbane International Film Festival

The International Film Festival of the Art of Cinematography Camerimage

Santa Barbara International Film Festival

British Society of Cinematographers (BSC) Awards

Australian Cinematographers Society

Australian Film Institute

References

External links

1942 births
Australian cinematographers
Best Cinematographer Academy Award winners
Best Cinematography BAFTA Award winners
European Film Award for Best Cinematographer winners
Living people
People from Warwick, Queensland
Members of the Order of Australia